NGC 365 is a barred spiral galaxy in the constellation Sculptor. It was discovered on November 25, 1834 by John Herschel. It was described by Dreyer as "faint, small, round, gradually a little brighter middle."

References

0365
18341125
Barred spiral galaxies
Sculptor (constellation)
003822